In the British Isles, and sometimes elsewhere, a home farm (sometimes known as a manor farm) is a part of a large country estate that is farmed by the landowner or an employed farm manager (often as a source of food and horse-keeping for the estate household), rather than being rented out to tenant farmers like most of the estate. Typically it would be near the landowner's house. The name may continue in use when the place is no longer a home farm.

Types of farms

Agriculture in the United Kingdom